Río Verde (Spanish for "green river") is a river of San Luis Potosí state in eastern Mexico.

It is a tributary of the Pánuco River, which empties in to the Gulf of Mexico.

See also
List of rivers of Mexico

References
Atlas of Mexico, River Basins, 1975
The Prentice Hall American World Atlas, 1984.
Rand McNally, The New International Atlas, 1993.

Rivers of San Luis Potosí
Tributaries of the Pánuco River